The Christie Pits riot occurred on 16 August 1933 at the Christie Pits (Willowvale Park) playground in Toronto, Ontario. The riot can be understood in the context of the Great Depression, anti-semitism, "Swastika Clubs" and parades and resentment of "foreigners" in Toronto, and the rise of Adolf Hitler and the Nazis in Germany in 1933.

Background 
The riot occurred in the midst of the Great Depression and six months after Adolf Hitler took power in Germany. The Toronto papers, including the Toronto Telegram and the Toronto Daily Star, as well as the Yiddish journal, Der Yiddisher Zhurnal, reported on how Jews were being dismissed from professions in Germany, including lawyers, professors, and teachers, as well as incidents of violence against them. Thus to Jews, the swastika represented degradation and physical violence against Jews, and was inflammatory.

At that time, the Jewish community in Toronto was predominantly poor and working-class.  Jewish families and youths in particular would therefore cool off during the hot summer months by staying in town and going to the predominantly Anglo Beaches area to swim. This resulted in complaints and resentment from some local residents. Some of the locals formed a "Swastika Club", which openly displayed the Nazi symbol to express their displeasure and make Jews feel unwanted. On August 1, 1933, the Swastika Club became the subject of an editorial in Toronto's Jewish Standard, which prompted multiple protests from local Jewish residents. On August 2, mass protests of young Jewish Canadians occurred at The Beaches, that were met by counter-protests from the members of Swastika Club.  The leaders of the Swastika Club initially insisted that the swastika had nothing to do with Hitler. They said they merely wanted to keep the Beach clean. This resulted in a tug of war between city officials and Jewish leaders, who tried to have the Swastika Club disband voluntarily, and the Swastika Club leadership, which pushed for legal action. By August 14, the situation reached a stalemate, with the leadership of Toronto Swastika Club participating in the Kitchener Swastika Club meeting, where an openly anti-Semitic agenda was pursued.

The riot 
The riot, which lasted six hours, broke out after a quarter-final baseball game at Christie Pits between two local clubs: Harbord Playground, consisting predominantly of Jewish and Italian players, and St. Peter's, a baseball team sponsored by St. Peter's Church, a Catholic church at Bathurst and Bloor.
 
The night of the riot was the second game between Harbord and St. Peter's. Two nights earlier, at the first game of the series, a swastika had been displayed. Police were warned in writing that there could be trouble at the second game, but those warnings were ignored. After the final out of the second game, Pit Gang members displayed a blanket with a large swastika painted on it. A number of Jewish boys and young men who had heard about the previous Swastika incident rushed the Swastika sign to destroy it, supporters of both sides (including Italians who supported the Jews) from the surrounding area joined in, and a fight started.

The Toronto Daily Star described the event the next day:

Aftermath 
No one was killed in the riot. There was criticism of the police for not being ready to intervene, as they had been during previous potential problems in the Beach area. After the riot, Mayor Stewart warned against displaying the swastika and there were no further riots.

The riot revealed the xenophobic attitudes toward Jews and other non-Anglo immigrants (such as Italian immigrants) among some Anglo Canadians. Jews represented the largest minority in Toronto in 1933 and were thus a target of xenophobic residents. The event had some parallels to the 1875 Jubilee riots, an outbreak of Protestant–Catholic sectarian violence in Toronto and Anti-Greek Riots which previously occurred in the city in 1918.

Legacy 
Some sources have interpreted The Tragically Hip's 1999 single "Bobcaygeon" as alluding to the riots, as the song's lyrics contain the words "riot" and "Aryan". This has been disputed, as the song is set in a contemporary context rather than the 1930s, and the words do not appear in close conjunction; however, the same verse contains a reference to The Men They Couldn't Hang, who wrote "Ghosts of Cable Street", a song about the anti-fascist Battle of Cable Street riot in London in 1936.
 
In August 2008, a Heritage Toronto plaque was presented to commemorate the 75th anniversary of the riot.

The incident was depicted in two graphic novels, Christie Pits by Jamie Michaels and illustrated by Doug Fedrau in 2019 and The Good Fight by Ted Staunton and Josh Rosen (ill.) in 2021.

See also
History of the Jews in Toronto

References

External links
Christie Pits Riot of 1933

1933 in Canada
History of Toronto
Antisemitic attacks and incidents
Canadian far-right political movements
Jews and Judaism in Toronto
Race riots in Canada
1933 riots
August 1933 events
1933 in Ontario
Antisemitism in Canada
1933 crimes in Canada
1933 in Judaism
1930s in Toronto
Religiously motivated violence in Canada
Italian diaspora in Canada
Anti-fascism in Canada